Dara Terzić Šterić (December 22, 1970) is a Serbian rhythmic gymnast. As a 17th year old girl, she represented Yugoslavia at the 1988 Summer Olympics in Seoul.

She works as a coach in the Rhythmic gymnastics club Palilula in Belgrade.

External links
Dara Terzić Šterić -  Sports-Reference.com
interview with Dara Terzić Šterić

1970 births
Living people
Serbian rhythmic gymnasts
Yugoslav rhythmic gymnasts
Olympic gymnasts of Yugoslavia
Gymnasts at the 1988 Summer Olympics